Jean Carioca may refer to:
Jean Carioca (footballer, born 1978) (Jean da Silva Duarte), Brazilian football defender
Jean Carioca (footballer, born 1988) (Jean Agostinho da Silva),  Brazilian football midfielder